God's Will Be Done (Italian: Fiat voluntas dei) is a 1936 Italian comedy drama film directed by Amleto Palermi and starring Angelo Musco, María Denis and Sarah Ferrati.

Cast

References

Bibliography 
 Aprà, Adriano. The Fabulous Thirties: Italian cinema 1929-1944. Electa International, 1979.

External links 
 

1936 comedy-drama films
Italian comedy-drama films
1936 films
1930s Italian-language films
Films directed by Amleto Palermi
1930s Italian films